Madonna of the Trail is a series of 12 identical monuments dedicated to the spirit of pioneer women in the United States. The monuments were commissioned by the National Society of Daughters of the American Revolution (NSDAR). They were installed in each of the 12 states along the National Old Trails Road, which extended from Cumberland, Maryland, to Upland, California.

Created by sculptor August Leimbach and funded by contributions, the Madonna of the Trail monuments were intended to provide a symbol of the courage and faith of the women whose strength and love aided so greatly in conquering the wilderness and establishing permanent homes. Dedicated in 1928 and 1929, the twelve statues became sources of local pride. Through the continuing efforts of local and national groups, all are currently in good condition and on display.

History
Some Madonna of the Trail monuments have become community landmarks.  On June 2, 2020, the Upland, California Madonna of the Trail monument was the site of a Black Lives Matter protest in the wake of the murder of George Floyd.

Design and specifications

Locations
There is one monument in each of the 12 states along the National Old Trails Highway (much of which later became U.S. Highway 40 and U.S. Highway 66). The monuments in order of dedication are:

Images

Further reading

See also

 List of statues
 National Auto Trail
U.S. Route 66

References

External links
  Madonna of the Trail | August Leimbach website

1928 sculptures
1929 sculptures
Buildings and structures in Apache County, Arizona
Buildings and structures in Prowers County, Colorado
Daughters of the American Revolution
Local monuments and memorials in the United States
Monuments and memorials in Arizona
Monuments and memorials on the National Register of Historic Places in California
Monuments and memorials in Colorado
Monuments and memorials in Illinois
Monuments and memorials in Indiana
Monuments and memorials in Kansas
Monuments and memorials in Maryland
Monuments and memorials in Missouri
Monuments and memorials in New Mexico
Monuments and memorials in Ohio
Monuments and memorials in Pennsylvania
Monuments and memorials in West Virginia
Outdoor sculptures in Arizona
Outdoor sculptures in California
Outdoor sculptures in Colorado
Outdoor sculptures in Illinois
Outdoor sculptures in Indiana
Outdoor sculptures in Kansas
Outdoor sculptures in Maryland
Outdoor sculptures in Missouri
Outdoor sculptures in New Mexico
Outdoor sculptures in Ohio
Outdoor sculptures in Pennsylvania
Outdoor sculptures in West Virginia
Stone sculptures in the United States
Tourist attractions along U.S. Route 66
Monuments and memorials to pioneer women
California Historical Landmarks
Upland, California
Buildings and structures in San Bernardino County, California
Sculptures of children in the United States
Sculptures of women in the United States